Career Edge Organization (also known as CEO, Career Edge or CareerEdge.ca) is a Canadian recruiter of candidates for internships with corporations, 

CEO focuses on new graduates, new graduates with self-declared disabilities, internationally qualified professionals coming to or who have recently immigrated to Canada and Canadian Armed Force Reservists 

The CEO  paid internship model includes coaching/mentoring, on-the-job training, industry knowledge transfer, and networking .  r.

CEO was the first online job board in Canada. Career Edge Organization is headquartered in Toronto, Ontario.

History and activities
In 1996, a group of Canadian  business leaders developed CEO. This initiative was created in response to a finding in the mid-1990s that more than 600,000 Canadian graduates were unemployed or underemployed.

In 1999, CEO added a paid internship program for graduates with disabilities called "Ability Edge." Further demographic changes and skills shortages led to CEO creating the Career Bridge paid internship program for "internationally qualified professionals" in 2003.

In 2009, CEO was the first to conduct a nationwide study of diverse Generation Y Canadians, in partnership with Angus Reid Strategies (formerly Ipsos Reid).

Since its inception, over 1,000 employers have worked CEO. In September 2010, CEO reached the milestone of the placement of over 10,000 interns.

In December 2011, CEO relaunched their online presence with a new website that takes advantage of social media and their recent rebranding exercise to unify and focus their three core programs under one web portal.

CEO partnered with the HRPA to deliver a new specialized program for Canadian employers which allows them to achieve their organizational objectives by accessing CHRP candidates for short-term HR projects. In February 2012, CEO placed their 500th intern with GE Canada.

Notes

References

External links
 

Career and technical education
Employment websites in Canada
Business organizations based in Canada
Internet properties established in 1996